St. Mary's Higher Secondary School is a primary and secondary school in Thiruvananthapuram, India. It is founded in 1940 by Archbishop Geevarghese Mar Ivanios. It is considered one of the largest schools in Asia, with the total number of students exceeding 14,000.

References

Syro-Malankara Catholic Church
Catholic secondary schools in India
Christian schools in Kerala
High schools and secondary schools in Thiruvananthapuram
Educational institutions established in 1940
1940 establishments in India